The first South American Chess Championship (Torneo Sudamericano, Torneio Sulamericano) was held in Montevideo (Carrasco), Uruguay, on December 25, 1921 – January 22, 1922. The eighteen-player single round-robin tournament was won by Roberto Grau 14/17, followed by Benito Villegas, Valentin Fernandez Coria and Rolando Illa, all got 12.5/17, etc.

The Torneio Sulamericano was replaced in 1951 by the Torneio Zonal Sulamericano, except for 1962 (*) when the Torneo Latino-americano was played.

Winners 

{| class="sortable wikitable"
! Year !! City !! Winner 
|-
| 1921/22 || Montevideo ||  
|-
| 1925 || Montevideo || 
|-
| 1928 || Mar del Plata || 
|-
| 1934 || Mar del Plata || 
|-
| 1934/35 || Buenos Aires || 
|-
| 1936 || Mar del Plata || 
|-
| 1937 || São Paulo || 
|-
| 1938 || Montevideo || 
|-
| 1951 || Mar del Plata/Buenos Aires || 
|-
| 1954 || Mar del Plata/Buenos Aires || 
|-
| 1957 || Rio de Janeiro || 
|-
| 1960 || São Paulo || 
|-
| 1962 (*)|| Mar del Plata || 
|-
| 1963 || Fortaleza || 
|-
| 1966 || Buenos Aires/Termas de Rio Hondo || 
|-
| 1969 || Mar del Plata || 
|-
| 1972 || São Paulo || 
|-
| 1975 || Fortaleza || 
|-
| 1978 || Tramandaí || 
|-
| 1982 || Moron || 
|-
| 1985 || Corrientes || 
|-
| 1987 || Santiago || 
|-
| 1989 || São Paulo || 
|-
| 1993 || Brasília || 
|-
| 1995 || São Paulo || 
|-
| 1998 || São Paulo || 
|-
| 2000 || São Paulo || 
|-
| 2001 || São Paulo || 
|-
| 2003 || São Paulo || 
|-
| 2005 || São Paulo || 
|-
| 2007 || São Paulo || 
|}

References

External links
BrasilBase
Campeonatos Sudamericanos

Supranational chess championships
Chess
Chess in Argentina
Chess in Brazil
Chess in Chile
Chess in Uruguay
1921 in chess
Recurring sporting events established in 1921
Chess in South America